XHSCAL-FM is a community radio station broadcasting to Contepec, Michoacán on 106.7 FM. It is known as La Monarca de Contepec and owned by La Monarca de Contepec, A.C.

History
La Monarca de Contepec filed for a station on October 10, 2016. The concession was received on September 19, 2018, and tests on the frequency began in November.

References

Radio stations in Michoacán
Community radio stations in Mexico
Radio stations established in 2018